"She's Not There" is the debut single by British rock band the Zombies, written by keyboardist Rod Argent. It reached  12 in the UK Singles Chart in September 1964, and  2 on the Billboard Hot 100 in the United States at the beginning of December 1964. In Canada, it reached  2.

Rolling Stone magazine ranked "She's Not There" No. 297 on its list of the 500 Greatest Songs of All Time. "She's Not There" is also The Zombies only song deemed "lyrically inappropriate" following the September 11th terrorist attacks.

Song profile 
Rod Argent built the lyrics of "She's Not There" from a John Lee Hooker song, whose title – "No One Told Me" – became a part of the opening phrase of "She's Not There". Following an 29 April 1964 performance by the Zombies at St Albans Market Hall, Argent played the one verse he had written of the song for Ken Jones who was set to produce the band's first recording session. Jones  encouraged Argent to write a second verse, intending for the band to record it. Argent recalls: "I wrote the song for Colin's range" – referring to Zombies' vocalist Colin Blunstone – "I could hear him singing it in my mind". The song's genres and musical styles are described by authors and music journalists as jazz rock, beat and pop rock.

"She's Not There" was the second of four songs recorded by the Zombies at a 22 June 1964 recording session at Decca's West Hampstead Studio 2. The backing tracks needed seven takes. One of the song's most distinctive features is Argent's electric piano sound; the instrument used was a Hohner Pianet. The backing vocals are in a folk-influenced close-harmony style. To make the single sound stronger for single release, Ken Jones organised Hugh Grundy to record a strident drum line overdub which only appears on the original mono single mix.

This minor key, jazz-tinged single was first aired in the United States during the first week in August 1964, on New York rock radio station WINS by Stan Z. Burns, who debuted it on his daily noontime "Hot Spot" segment, during which new songs were played. The tune began to catch on in early autumn and eventually reached  2 on the Billboard Hot 100 in December 1964.  It was kept from the  1 spot by "Mr. Lonely" by Bobby Vinton.

Album releases 
The song was later included both on the Zombies' debut album Begin Here, released in the UK in December 1964, and the US album The Zombies issued January 1965. It was also included on the soundtrack to the 1979 feature film More American Graffiti.

Chart history

Weekly charts

Year-end charts

Santana cover 
"She's Not There" was a hit for Santana when it appeared on their 1977 album Moonflower. Their version peaked at  11 in the UK. It was also a hit in the US, spending 14 weeks on the Billboard Hot 100 and peaking at  27, as well as reaching  20 on the Cash Box Top 100 chart. Their take on it features Greg Walker as the lead vocalist.

Charts

Weekly charts

Year-end charts

Other notable covers 
 In February 1965, Swedish pop group Ola & the Janglers released the song as their second single, backed by Manfred Mann's "Don't Ask Me What I Say". It became their breakthrough hit, reaching  10 on Tio i Topp for a week before being voted off.
Colin Blunstone, under the pseudonym Neil McArthur, released a solo version in 1969, reaching  34 in the UK.
 UK Subs 1979 cover has reached No. 36 in UK.

References

External links
 
 

The Zombies songs
1964 debut singles
1977 singles
Songs written by Rod Argent
1964 songs
Parrot Records singles
Decca Records singles
Columbia Records singles
Santana (band) songs
Cashbox number-one singles
Number-one singles in New Zealand